Lincheng County is a county in the southwest of Hebei province, People's Republic of China, in the foothills of the Taihang Mountains. It is under the administration of the prefecture-level city of Xingtai. It borders Neiqiu in the south, Longyao and Baixiang in the east, Gaoyi and Zanhuang in the north, and the province of Shanxi in the west.

Administrative divisions
The county administers 4 towns and 4 townships.

Towns:
Lincheng, Dongzhen, Xishu, Haozhuang

Townships:
Heicheng Township, Yageying Township, Shicheng Township, Zhaozhuang Township

Climate

References

 
County-level divisions of Hebei
Xingtai